Eric Funk is an American contemporary classical composer and conductor. Originally from Deer Lodge, Montana, he currently resides in Bozeman, Montana, where he teaches music courses at Montana State University.

Mr. Funk's considerable compositional output includes five symphonies, three operas, six ballet scores, three large works for chorus and orchestra, thirteen concertos, several orchestral tone poems, and numerous works for chamber ensembles, solo instruments, and vocal works. Among recent prominent premiers of his works include his one-act solo opera for contralto and ballet troupe, Akhmatova, based on key texts from the Russian poet's life, his Violin Concerto, and the song cycles Gongora (for baritone and chamber orchestra, on texts by the Spanish baroque poet) and Sequentia (contralto and 9-person chamber ensemble, on texts by Paul Celan).

Newly completed works include the massive Mandelshtam: A Valediction to the 20th Century, a work in 5 movements for large chorus, two orchestras, and amplified string quartet, based on poems by the Russian poet Osip Mandelshtam. The latter was commissioned by the Gallatin Performing Arts Center for their upcoming grand opening. Past performance venues for his works include Carnegie Hall, the Renda Theater, and the Gaudeamus International Interpreters of Contemporary Music Festival (Rotterdam); as well as numerous theaters and concert halls in the U.S. and Eastern Europe. His works have earned him numerous awards and commissions, including 13 ASCAP Standard Awards, the 2001 Governor's Award for the Arts (Montana), and three Arts Commission Fellowships.

Numerous compositions of Mr. Funk have been recorded commercially. These include three releases on the MMC label, featuring three of his symphonies (Nos. 1, 3, and 4), as well as two concertos and a string quartet. His Symphony No. 5, "Dante Ascending" was recently released on the composer's own label, and recorded by the Latvian National Symphony Orchestra and Opera Chorus, conducted by Terje Mikkelsen.

Mr. Funk was featured on the Charles Osgood CBS Sunday Morning show in October 1998, which in turn followed on the heels of a front-page story in the New York Times "Arts & Leisure" section (April 14, 1998). More recently, Mr. Funk was featured on the nationally syndicated NPR radio show, "Theme & Variations" (August 23–30, 2002).

From 1994 to 2002, Eric was conductor of the Helena Symphony Orchestra in Helena, Montana. From 1994 to 1999, he was also the conductor of the Gallatin Chamber Orchestra in Bozeman, Montana.

Eric has also served as artistic director for 11th & Grant with Eric Funk, an Emmy Award-winning show broadcast on Montana PBS featuring local musicians.

References

External links 
Eric Funk's personal website
 

1949 births
American male composers
21st-century American composers
Montana State University faculty
Portland State University alumni
Living people
People from Deer Lodge, Montana
People from Bozeman, Montana
21st-century American male musicians